() is a Japanese confectionery company selling azuki bean products. Its headquarters are in Tsu, Mie Prefecture.  In March 2009 Imuraya announced that it would buy an 83.3% stake in LA/I.C and rename it Imuraya USA.

Marketing

The brand has a product placement deal for the Yakuza games and its products have been available to buy in convenience stores on recent titles.

References

External links

Imuraya Confectionery
Imuraya Confectionery 

Companies listed on the Tokyo Stock Exchange
Food and drink companies of Japan
1947 establishments in Japan
Companies based in Mie Prefecture
Japanese brands
Confectionery companies of Japan